"Param Sundari" is a 2021 Indian Hindi-language song composed by A. R. Rahman for the film Mimi. Based on the Marathi film Mala Aai Vhhaychy! (2011) by Samruddhi Porey, the film was directed by Laxman Utekar and starred Kriti Sanon in the lead. The song is written by Amitabh Bhattacharya and sung by Shreya Ghoshal. The song was released as the lead single along with the soundtrack album on 16 July 2021. The music video for the song was released on the same day, and had viewed more than 500 million times across YouTube as on 25th January 2022. The song peaked at No. 184 on the  Billboard Global Excl. U.S. chart.

Music video 
The song was filmed at a huge set erected at Film City in Mumbai. Initially planned to be shot during March–April 2020, it was delayed eventually due to the COVID-19 pandemic. It was later shot during January 2021. Utekar, said in an interview with The Times of India, that "the song was initially planned to be shot in Rajasthan, but travelling with a big crew and cast will not be feasible, especially during the pandemic restrictions. The international cast of the film will be flying to Mumbai for the shoot as they are required for the continuity of the film." He further added that the song is important for the narrative.

For the song, Kriti Sanon who gained 15 kilograms to play a role of surrogate mother, had trained intensively for three months to reduce weight. The song was filmed with more than 600 dancers in the background, along with Kriti and Sai Tamhankar (who played Shama, Kriti's friend in the film). The song was choreographed by Ganesh Acharya.

Release and reception 
"Param Sundari" served as the lead single from the soundtrack album, was released on 16 July 2021, by Sony Music India, along with the entire soundtrack, which featured seven songs. The song and the album was released in spatial and lossless audio formats supported with Dolby Atmos on Apple Music.

Vipin Nair of Music Aloud stated Param Sundari is "A. R. Rahman nailing the “mass entertainer” formula in a way that he hasn’t done in a while". He appreciated Shreya Ghoshal's vocals, but found "equally praiseworthy is the chorus that matches her brilliantly". A review from Humming Heart said that "Param Sundari opens with a mischievous and energetic (uncredited) chorus that lends way to a brief but arresting bassline, and to the cracking vocals of Shreya Ghoshal laden with tantalizing verses. The song launches into the full item number zone and holds us hooked for its judiciously short runtime of three and a half minutes. That is Rahman delivering a trademark Bollywood hit number."

Sankhayan Ghosh of Film Companion stated "The song has a catchy hook, a good chorus, but see how Rahman and Amitabh Bhattacharya subvert the “item number”. Bhattacharya’s lyrics, sung by Shreya Ghoshal, are in a constant mode of shirking away unwanted male attention". Joginder Tuteja of Bollywood Hungama said that "The tremendous rustic sounds of the music with that base of the drum beats and the wicked modern line is what makes the song so good."

Celebrities reaction 
"Param Sundari" became trending in social media soon after its release and many fans did cover versions of this song. Celebrities such as Hina Khan, Rupali Ganguly, Raksha Gupta and other television actors performed cover versions.  A fan of Kim Seok-jin (BTS) had created a video with this song in the background, replacing Kriti Sanon as 'Param Sundari'. Actress Kangana Ranaut, took to Instagram to praise the song and appreciated Kriti Sanon's dance moves.

Personnel 
Credits adapted from Sony Music India

 A. R. Rahman – composer, producer, musical arrangements
 Shreya Ghoshal – playback singer
 Amitabh Bhattacharya – lyricist
 Sarthak Kalyani – additional vocals
 Suryansh – additional vocals
 Hriday Gattani – additional vocals 
 Nakul Abhyankar – additional vocals, audio mixing
 Pooja Tiwari – additional vocals
 Rakshita Suresh – additional vocals
 Kutle Khan – folk voice, morsing and khartal
 Keba Jeremiah – guitar
 Sunil Miller – guitar
 Dipesh Varma – Indian percussions
 Hiral Viradia – music supervisor
 Ranjit Barot – additional arrangements and programming
 Suresh Permal – sound engineer (Panchathan Record Inn, Chennai), audio mixing, mastering (studio mastering)
 Karthik Sekaran – sound engineer (Panchathan Record Inn, Chennai)
 T. R. Krishna Chetan – sound engineer (Panchathan Record Inn, Chennai)
 S. Sivakumar – sound engineer (AM Studios, Chennai)
 Pradeep Menon – sound engineer (AM Studios, Chennai), mastering (Apple Digital Master)
 Aravind Crescendo – sound engineer (AM Studios, Chennai)
 R. Samidurai – musicians' fixer
 T. M. Faizuddin – music co-ordinator
 Abdul Haiyum Siddique – music co-ordinator

Accolades

Notes

References

External links 
 

2021 songs
Indian film songs
Hindi-language songs
Songs with music by A. R. Rahman
Shreya Ghoshal songs
Viral videos